Hasanabad (also Romanized as Ḩasanābād; also known as Ḩoseynābād and Husainābād) is a village in Hendudur Rural District, Sarband District, Shazand County, Markazi Province, Iran. At the 2006 census, its population was 50, in 9 families.

References 

Populated places in Shazand County